Jakub Rezek (born 29 May 1998) is a professional Czech football midfielder currently playing for Hradec Králové in the Czech First League.

Career
He made his senior league debut for Slovácko on 18 March 2017 in a Czech First League 2–1 home win against Mladá Boleslav.

References

External links 
 
 Jakub Rezek official international statistics
 
 Jakub Rezek profile on the 1. FC Slovácko official website

Czech footballers
Czech Republic youth international footballers
1998 births
Living people
Czech First League players
Czech National Football League players
1. FC Slovácko players
FC Vysočina Jihlava players
Association football midfielders
People from Uherský Brod
FC Hradec Králové players
Sportspeople from the Zlín Region